The Icelandic Men's Basketball Cup (Icelandic: Bikarkeppni KKÍ), also known as VÍS bikarinn for sponsorship reasons, is an annual professional basketball competition between clubs in Iceland. It is Iceland's first-tier cup competition, and is not to be confused with Iceland's former second-tier cup competition, the Company Cup.

History and format
The first edition of the Icelandic Cup championship took place in 1965, and was won by Ármann. In 1968 and 1969, the cup competition was not held, but it has been held regularly every year from 1970 onward. Teams in Úrvalsdeild karla and Division I have an automatic bye to the Final 32 while lower league teams might have to play preliminary rounds for a place, depending on the number of teams. All the rounds are played with a single game knockout format. The final four and the finals are played on a single weekend.

Finally, the winner of the Icelandic Cup championship, or the runner-up if the same team wins both the cup and national championship, will then face the winner of the Úrvalsdeild karla championship in a single game to determine the winner of the Icelandic Supercup championship in the beginning of the next season.

Title holders 

 1965 Ármann
 1966 KR 
 1967 KR
 1968 Not Held
 1969 Not Held
 1970 KR 
 1971 KR
 1972 KR
 1973 KR 
 1973–74 KR
 1974–75 Ármann
 1975–76 Ármann
 1976–77 KR
 1977–78 ÍS
 1978–79 KR
 1979–80 Valur 
 1980–81 Valur 
 1981–82 Fram   
 1982–83 Valur 
 1983–84 KR  
 1984–85 Haukar  
 1985–86 Haukar  
 1986–87 Njarðvík
 1987–88 Njarðvík
 1988–89 Njarðvík 
 1989–90 Njarðvík 
 1990–91 KR 
 1991–92 Njarðvík
 
 1992–93 Keflavík 
 1993–94 Keflavík
 1994–95 Grindavík 
 1995–96 Haukar 
 1996–97 Keflavík 
 1997–98 Grindavík 
 1998–99 Njarðvík 
 1999–00 Grindavík
 2000–01 ÍR
 2001–02 Njarðvík 
 2002–03 Keflavík 
 2003–04 Keflavík 
 2004–05 Njarðvík 
 2005–06 Grindavík 
 2006–07 ÍR
 2007–08 Snæfell
 2008–09 Stjarnan 
 2009–10 Snæfell 
 2010–11 KR
 2011–12 Keflavík 
 2012–13 Stjarnan 
 2013–14 Grindavík 
 2014–15 Stjarnan
 2015–16 KR
 2016–17 KR
 2017–18 Tindastóll
 2018–19 Stjarnan
 2019–20 Stjarnan
 2020–21 Njarðvík
 2021–22 Stjarnan
 2022–23 Valur

Cup Finals MVP
 1987  Jóhannes Kristbjörnsson (Njarðvík)
 2010  Sean Burton (Snæfell)
 2011  Pavel Ermolinskij (KR)
 2012  Charles Parker (Keflavík)
 2013  Jarrid Frye (Stjarnan)
 2014  Sigurður Þorsteinsson  (Grindavík)
 2015  Justin Shouse (Stjarnan)
 2016  Helgi Már Magnússon (KR)
 2017  Jón Arnór Stefánsson (KR)
 2018  Pétur Rúnar Birgisson (Tindastóll)
 2019  Brandon Rozzell (Stjarnan)
 2020  Ægir Steinarsson (Stjarnan)
 2021  Dedrick Basile (Njarðvík)
 2022  David Gabrovšek (Stjarnan)
 2023  Kári Jónsson (Valur)

See also
Icelandic Basketball Federation
Úrvalsdeild karla
Icelandic Basketball Supercup
Icelandic Division I

References

External links
 Icelandic Basketball Federation 
 History of the Cup finals 

1965 establishments in Iceland
Men
Basketball cup competitions in Europe
Recurring sporting events established in 1965